Cindy Sargon is an Australian chef, entrepreneur, television presenter and voice over artist.

Career

Television
Sargon was a co-presenter on the third and fourth seasons of Surprise Chef, and has hosted  Melbourne Woman, and the Australian version of Saturday Kitchen. She also appeared on the first season of My Restaurant Rules in 2004. In 2007 she started hosting Food 4 Life on the Seven Network. Sargon also presented the IGA-sponsored 5-day meal planner segment on The Morning Show, and was a presenter on Melbourne Weekender.

Other
In 1993 Sargon co-founded with husband Michael Coade a wholesale pasta business, Alligator Brand, which provided pasta for the athletes at the 2000 Summer Olympics in Sydney, Australia. The company has also provided pasta for Qantas, Singapore Airlines and Korean Air, and has been sold in Costco, Thomas Dux and David Jones stores. Sargon and Coade also founded Per Tutti pasta.

Sargon posed for Black+White magazine in 2004. She previously presented a weekly restaurant review on 3AW's breakfast program, Breakfast with Ross & John, under the segment identity "Lazy Susan". Sargon is also a prolific commercial voice over artist.

Sargon is the first official patron for the Artists for Kids Culture trust in Victoria.

Personal life
Sargon is of Assyrian descent. She has a daughter with Coade, Pascale.

References

Australian chefs
Australian television presenters
Australian television chefs
Living people
Year of birth missing (living people)
Australian people of Assyrian descent
Women chefs
Australian women television presenters
Australian company founders
Australian women company founders
Australian voice actresses